WWF The Music, Volume 2 is the second compilation album by the World Wrestling Federation (now known as the World Wrestling Entertainment, or WWE) on November 18, 1997. It primarily features contemporary theme songs of wrestlers on the roster at the time.

Track listing

Hits of the World Wrestling Federation: We Gotta Wrestle

Earlier in 1997, a similar album was released outside the United States titled Hits of the World Wrestling Federation: We Gotta Wrestle. The album, which included a Sunny poster and a sticker sheet, was missing two tracks from Volume 2, Ken Shamrock and Dude Love's themes, but added Jake "The Snake" Roberts' and Faarooq's themes which were not included on Volume 2. It also differed in six tracks:
track 2 (Marc Mero & Sable - "Wild Cat") this is the first theme and is on "Volume 2", the  "We Gotta Wrestle" version  is shorter at 2:51, "We Gotta Wrestle" version was re-released on Volume 2
track 3 (Ahmed Johnson - "Pearl River Rip") length is shorter at 2:45 vs. Volume 2 at 3:15; the theme debuted on "Volume 2"
track 9 (Faarooq - " We Are The Nation") includes rapping by PG-13; this is the first version the second version is on "We Gotta Wrestle" version and included an early instrumental of the theme in early 1997
track 11 (Rocky Maivia - "Destiny") was The Rock's first theme, his second theme is "Blue Chipper" from WWE: Uncaged VIII and is on We Gotta Wrestle as a bonus track, while his third is on Volume 2;  
track 12 (Flash Funk - Can't Get Enough) does not have the Volume 2 version's starting quote; On "We Gotta Wrestle" Version it is a dance track 
track 13 (Sunny - "I Know You Want Me") does not feature the extra quotes of the Volume 2 version, the actual theme debuted at Survivor Series 1996
track 14 (Shawn Michaels - "Bad Attitude") is a new song, used for advertising in 1997.
Tracks 1, 2, 4, 6, 7, 8 and 10 are the same as on WWF The Music, Volume 2.

Track listing
 The Undertaker - "Darkside" (3:52)
 Stone Cold Steve Austin - "Hell Frozen Over" (2:57)
 Ahmed Johnson - "Pearl River Rip" (2:45)
 Marc Mero & Sable - "Wild Cat" (2:51)
 Jake "The Snake" Roberts - "Snake" (2:44)
 Bret Hart - "You Start the Fire" (3:10)
 Vader - "Mastodon" (3:09)
 Mankind - "Ode to Freud" (3:02)
 Faarooq - "Nation of Domination" (3:01)
 Sycho Sid - "Snap" (3:18)
 Rocky Maivia - "Destiny" (2:36)
 Flash Funk - "Can't Get Enough" (3:20)
 Sunny - "I Know You Want Me" (2:46)
 Shawn Michaels - "Bad Attitude" (2:44)

See also

Music in professional wrestling

References

WWE albums
1997 compilation albums
E1 Music compilation albums